Pertti Johannes Karppinen (born 17 February 1953) is a retired Finnish rower noted for his three consecutive Olympic gold medals in single sculls in 1976, 1980 and 1984.

Biography
Karppinen won the world titles in 1979 and 1985 and once held the world record in indoor rowing. His style was to row a steady race and finish with a devastating sprint. In the early portions of the race, he would often trail his rivals by several boat length, only to catch them at the race finish.

Karppinen and great German sculler Peter-Michael Kolbe had one of the greatest rivalries in the history of the sport. Although Kolbe has more Olympic and World Championship medals than any other single sculler in history, he never won an Olympic gold medal. Twice, in 1976 and 1984, Kolbe had the lead the entire race, only to be passed in the last few meters of the race by Karppinen. Kolbe and Karppinen did not face each other in the 1980 Games because West Germany chose to boycott the games to protest the Soviet Union's invasion of Afghanistan.

Karppinen and Kolbe faced each other one last time at the 1988 Summer Olympics. Karppinen missed making the finals, but won the consolation race for seventh place. Kolbe again won a silver medal being beaten by prodigy Thomas Lange. Karppinen would go on to compete in the 1992 Summer Olympics finishing in tenth place.

Karppinen and Russia's Vyacheslav Ivanov are the only men to win gold medals in the single scull at three straight Olympics. Besides single sculls, Karppinen also rowed doubles with his younger brother Reima and won a silver medal at the 1981 World Rowing Championships. Currently Karppinen works as a national rowing coach, and also trains his son Juho, and daughter Eeva, who both compete in rowing at the international level.

See also
 Athletes with most gold medals in one event at the Olympic Games

References

External links
 
 
 
 
 

1953 births
Living people
Finnish male rowers
Rowers at the 1976 Summer Olympics
Rowers at the 1980 Summer Olympics
Rowers at the 1984 Summer Olympics
Rowers at the 1988 Summer Olympics
Rowers at the 1992 Summer Olympics
Olympic rowers of Finland
Medalists at the 1976 Summer Olympics
Medalists at the 1980 Summer Olympics
Medalists at the 1984 Summer Olympics
Olympic medalists in rowing
Olympic gold medalists for Finland
World Rowing Championships medalists for Finland
Sportspeople from Southwest Finland